Joseva Ravouvou (born March 21, 1991) is a Fijian-born rugby player who plays for the New Zealand national rugby sevens team.
Ravouvou joined the New Zealand sevens team in 2016 and made his debut at the 2017 Hong Kong Sevens. Ravouvou scored two tries in a 38–14 win over Argentina in the 2017 South Africa Sevens final, and was named Man of the Match.
Joe Ravouvou sign with Aviron Bayonnais rugby for 2 years.

References

External links
 

Living people
Fijian rugby union players
1991 births
Auckland rugby union players
New Zealand international rugby sevens players
Fijian emigrants to New Zealand